MAT Airways was an airline based in Skopje, North Macedonia. Its main base was Skopje "Alexander the Great" Airport.

History
The biggest Serbian tourist agency Kon Tiki Travel, Belgrade, and Metropolitan Investment Group, Belgrade, in accordance with Macedonian statutory regulations have established the new air transport company. The airline leased its first aircraft from Aviogenex, however, this plane has been returned to its owner.

Skywings International Airlines, Macedonia’s largest charter airline, was left without an operating license and decided to merge with its rival MAT, with the aim of reducing costs and optimizing operations. As a result, MAT operated 2 aircraft.
In May 2011 Skywings decided to split from MAT, only a month after they merged.

On 4 July 2011, it was announced that MAT Airways has suspended its services. Their only aircraft is currently grounded and it's not announced when they will resume flights.
The Macedonian Civil Aviation Agency says that it did not play a part in MAT’s service suspension and adds that the airline has a permit to operate flights from Skopje and Ohrid to Zurich, Düsseldorf, Berlin, Hamburg, Vienna and Copenhagen until 15 June 2012.

On 15 July, MAT Airways resumed their services. The airline voluntarily grounded its sole aircraft, a Boeing 737-500. According to MAT’s management it did so in order to review its position on the market in face of increased competition. However, other sources claim that the airline has been having financial problems.

Destinations
According to the Skopje Airport and MAT Airways websites, MAT operated the following service (as of May 2011):
The airline is now closed down.

Europe
Belgium
 Brussels - Brussels Airport
Germany
 Berlin - Berlin Schönefeld Airport
 Düsseldorf - Düsseldorf Airport
Hamburg - Hamburg Airport
Stuttgart - Stuttgart Airport
Italy
 Rome - Leonardo da Vinci-Fiumicino Airport
Macedonia
Ohrid - Ohrid "St. Paul the Apostle" Airport [Secondary Hub]
Skopje - Skopje "Alexander the Great" Airport [Hub]
Switzerland
 Zurich - Zurich Airport

Fleet
The MAT Airways fleet included the following aircraft:

External links

References

Defunct airlines of North Macedonia
Airlines established in 2009
Airlines disestablished in 2011
Macedonian companies established in 2009